Rerum Creator Optime was a hymn sung in Matins prior to 1962.

References

Liturgy of the Hours
Latin-language Christian hymns